(shortened to ROOD) is a Dutch socialist youth organisation.

Ideals and policies
ROOD's main goals are the promotion of a socialist society.

Organisation 
Between 1999 and 2003, ROOD was a group within the party, initially subtitled "young initiative within the SP". It was the successor of the "J-team".

Locally, ROOD is organised in groups. There exist criteria for forming a group, such as a minimum number of (active) members. The number of groups is continuously fluctuating, but was 20 on average in 2005. Stable groups exist in Amsterdam, Delft, Den Bosch, Groningen, Utrecht and The Hague. ROOD-members can be anyone between 14 and 28. They formerly had to be a member of the SP, except for members below 16 years of age.

Nationally, ROOD has a board consisting of five people with a varying number of supporting advisors. The board, elected nationally, coordinates the groups and organises nationwide action campaign and activities such as education and excursions. In May 2012 Lieke Smits was elected chairperson. She is the successor of Leon Botter, who was chairman between 2009 and 2012. He was elected after Eva Gerrebrands stepped down. She was the successor of Gijsbert Houtbeckers, who was chairperson since June 2007, succeeding Renske Leijten who held the position since June 2005.

Activities and stances 
The main activities of ROOD are political activism and educating its members.

Campaigns 
In 2003, ROOD was active protesting against the obligation for all citizens to be always able to identify themselves, and against cuts in education. There were also buildings occupied to attract attention to the lack of housing for young people and at various universities, actions were held for fair trade coffee at universities. ROOD also sent a representative to the European Social Forum (ESF) in Paris.

Since 2003, ROOD organises a yearly Huisjesmelker van het Jaar vote, where students vote for the worst private landlord in the country.

In 2004, ROOD started a campaign against animal testing in the cosmetics industry, in 2005 L'Oréal were targeted to stop animal testing when ROOD visited delivered a signed petition to the company.

ROOD also campaigns on international themes such as globalisation. In 2005, ROOD facilitated an exposition by young Palestinians about their culture, in different Dutch cities. After a visit of ROOD members to the occupied areas in Palestine, a declaration of friendship was signed with the football club Hapoel Bnei Sakhnin, by ROOD referred to as "FC Bnei Sakhnin". In the Netherlands, ROOD started a supporters club for this Arab Israeli club. ROOD also participated in the successful campaign against the European Constitution with the slogan "Zeg je ja of denk je na" ("do you say yes, or do you think?").

In 2006 ROOD organised two electoral campaigns of its own, supporting the SP in the municipal elections and in the national elections.

Also in 2006, ROOD started the website www.watvooreikelszijnjullie.nl, a parody of the government website www.watvooreikelbenjij.nl, meant to teach values to young people. ROOD's stated reasons for the satirical site are that the government site represents a waste of public money (ca. 1 million euro for the campaign) and that the language used by the government site lacks respect (wat voor eikel ben jij can be translated as what kind of dick are you). ROOD also criticised the fact that this site was obviously linked to MSN, which means free publicity for Microsoft.

Since 2007, ROOD has been organising actions for the improvement of the education system. The main focus of these actions was against the '1040 hour norm' (a norm that forces schools to give an unrealistic high amount of lessons, creating a huge amount of 'free hours' for students). This 1040 norm caused a spontaneous all-out strike among secondary school students.

Publications 
ROOD publishes two student newspapers:
 The Blikopener (eyeopener), for HBO and university students;
 The Code ROOD (code red), for  all youths between the age of 14 and 28.
The Code ROOD appears four times a year and contains political comments and news about activities by ROOD. The Blikopener appears twice a year. They are distributed free of charge at schools, and in some places are distributed at homes in areas with many students.

Until 2006, ROOD had a monthly page in the party magazine, the Tribune.

Since 2006, ROOD is distributing the ROOD-magazine for its members. It is distributed twice a year and will contain in-depth political analysis for ROOD-members.

Relation to the SP 

Unlike other political youth organisations, ROOD was closely linked to the party. For the municipal elections in 2006, 10% of the elected candidates are from ROOD, and for the legislative elections in 2006, former chairperson Renske Leijten is at number 9 on the candidate list, and was one of the youngest candidates for parliament.

The Socialist Party withdrew its funding from ROOD in November 2020 after multiple alleged instances of entryism. This included accusations of "infiltrated by communist radicals" and the youth organisation being accused of breaking party rules. Prior to this, the party has expelled a number of activists that were accused of being members of Marxist Forum and/or Communist Platform, of which the Socialist Party has stated are rival parties. The youth wing also voted in amendments to publicly stand against coalitions which angered the party.

In June 2021, the party council of the SP decided to sever all ties with ROOD, meaning ROOD would no longer receive government subsidies. The SP subsequently announced that it would establish a new youth organization.

References

External links 
 
 Palestinian exposition, April 2005
 Supportersclub FC Bnei Sakhnin

Organizations established in 2003
Socialist Party (Netherlands)
Youth wings of political parties in the Netherlands